Jalen Thompson (born July 18, 1998) is an American football safety for the Arizona Cardinals of the National Football League (NFL). He played college football at Washington State.

Early life and high school
Thompson was born in Compton, California and grew up in Compton, California. He originally attended La Serna High School where he was named honorable mention All-San Gabriel Valley League as a sophomore as the Lancers went on to win the 2013 CIF Southern Section title. He transferred to Downey High School following his sophomore year where he played both wide receiver and cornerback and was named All-CIF and All-San Gabriel Valley League in his junior and senior seasons. As a senior, Thompson intercepted five passed and averaged 20.2 yards per reception and was named to the All-Area Dream Team by the Long Beach Press-Telegram. Thompson was rated a three-star recruit by ESPN, Rivals and Scout and the No. 56 cornerback nationally by ESPN.com. He ultimately committed to play college football at Washington State over offers from San Diego State, New Mexico State, Army, and Navy.

College career
Thompson entered Washington State as an early enrollee and participated in the Cougars' spring practices. He was named the starting strong safety entering the season and was named a True Freshman All-American by ESPN after recording 51 tackles and a team-leading seven pass breakups in 13 games. As a sophomore, Thompson led the Cougars with 73 tackles, including 5.5 for loss, two pass breakups and four interceptions (T-3rd in the Pac-12) and led the conference with three fumble recoveries and was named second-team All-Pac-12 Conference and first-team all-conference by the Associated Press. Thompson entered his junior season on the Chuck Bednarik Award watchlist and recorded 67 tackles (4th on the team) along with two interceptions and eight passes broken up and was named honorable mention all-conference. Thompson lost his final season of eligibility due to a violation of NCAA rules going into his senior season, which was reportedly due to purchasing a non-steroid over-the-counter supplement that is banned by the NCAA. Over the course of his collegiate career, Thompson started all 39 of Washington State's games while on the team and finished with 191 tackles with six interceptions and 17 passes broken up.

Professional career

After being declared ineligible for his final season at Washington State, Thompson entered the 2019 NFL Supplemental Draft. He was selected by the Arizona Cardinals in the fifth round of the supplemental draft and was the only player selected. He signed a four-year contract with the Cardinals on July 17, 2019.

Thompson made his NFL debut on September 8, 2019, against the Detroit Lions, playing seven snaps on special teams. He made his first career start on October 6, 2019, against the Cincinnati Bengals, making eight tackles in a 26-23 win. Thompson recorded his first career interception on November 17, 2019, picking off a pass from San Francisco 49ers quarterback Jimmy Garoppolo in the fourth quarter of a 36-26 loss. He finished his rookie season with 57 tackles, three passes defended and an interception in 15 games played, starting nine of the Cardinals final 12 games.

Thompson entered the 2020 season as the Cardinals starting strong safety. He suffered an ankle injury in Week 1 and was placed on injured reserve on September 17, 2020. He was activated on November 4. Thompson played in five games with four starts in 2020 and finished the season with 19 tackles and one pass defended.

Thompson remained the Cardinals starting strong safety in 2021 and led the team with 121 tackles. He also recorded seven passes defensed and three interceptions through 17 games and 12 starts.

On September 2, 2022, Thompson signed a three-year, $40 million contract extension including $24.5 million guaranteed with the Cardinals through the 2025 season.

References

External links
Washington State Cougars bio
Arizona Cardinals bio

1998 births
Living people
American football safeties
Arizona Cardinals players
People from Paramount, California
Players of American football from California
Sportspeople from Downey, California
Washington State Cougars football players